The Burkina Faso national under-17 football team is the national under-17 football team of Burkina Faso and is controlled by the Fédération Burkinabé de Foot-Ball. The team's main objectives are to qualify and play at the Africa U-17 Cup of Nations and the FIFA U-17 World Cup.

Competitive record

FIFA U-17 World Cup record

Africa U-17 Cup of Nations record

CAF U-16 and U-17 World Cup Qualifiers record 

Denotes draws include knockout matches decided on penalty kicks.

Current squad 
 The following players were called up for the 2023 Africa U-17 Cup of Nations qualification matches.
 Match dates: 12, 15 and 18 June 2022
 Opposition: ,  and 
 Caps and goals correct as of:''' 18 January 2021, after the match against

References

African national under-17 association football teams
Burkina Faso national football team